Beau Fermor (born 15 August 1998) is an Australian professional rugby league footballer who plays as a  for the Gold Coast Titans in the NRL.

Background
Born in Dalby, Queensland, Fermor played his junior rugby league for the Dalby Devils.

Playing career
In 2014, Fermor played for the Toowoomba Clydesdales Cyril Connell Cup side, moving up to their Mal Meninga Cup side a year later before being signed by the Melbourne Storm. In 2016, he played for Melbourne's under-20 side, playing 27 games over two seasons, scoring 11 tries. 

In 2018, Fermor signed with the Newcastle Knights, joining their Jersey Flegg Cup side. In July 2018, he represented the Queensland under-20 side in their win over New South Wales. At the end of the 2018 season, Fermor was named the Jersey Flegg Cup Player of the Year and signed a two-year extension with the Newcastle club. In 2019, he spent the season playing for the Knights' NSW Cup side.

2020
On 30 January, Fermor was granted a release by Newcastle and signed with the Gold Coast Titans on a three-year deal.

In Round 8 of the 2020 NRL season, Fermor made his NRL debut against the Cronulla-Sutherland Sharks, replacing the injured Kevin Proctor.

2021
Fermor played 15 games for the Gold Coast in the 2021 NRL season including the club's elimination final loss against the Sydney Roosters.

2022
In round 22 of the 2022 NRL season, Fermor scored two tries for the Gold Coast in a shock 44-24 victory over Manly which ended the clubs ten game losing streak and lifted them off the bottom of the table.
Fermor finished the 2022 season playing 23 games as the club finished 13th on the table. Fermor finished as the clubs top try scorer with eleven tries.

References

External links
Gold Coast Titans profile
NRL profile

1998 births
Living people
Australian rugby league players
Gold Coast Titans players
Rugby league second-rows
Rugby league players from Queensland
Toowoomba Clydesdales players